Pichit Burapavong (born 5 May 1944) is a Thai sports shooter. He competed at the 1976 Summer Olympics and the 1984 Summer Olympics.

References

1944 births
Living people
Pichit Burapavong
Pichit Burapavong
Shooters at the 1976 Summer Olympics
Shooters at the 1984 Summer Olympics
Place of birth missing (living people)
Pichit Burapavong